Slankamen may refer to:

 Stari Slankamen ("Old Slankamen"), a village in Vojvodina, Serbia
 Novi Slankamen ("New Slankamen"), a village in Vojvodina, Serbia
 Battle of Slankamen, during the Great Turkish War in 1691